The Church of St Hugh at Durleigh in the English county of Somerset was built in the 11th century. It is a Grade II* listed building.

History

The building was first constructed in the 11th century and then revised and restored in the 14th and 15th centuries. It underwent Victorian restoration in the late 19th century.

The parish is part of the benefice of Bridgwater Holy Trinity and Durleigh Saint Hugh within the Diocese of Bath and Wells.

Architecture

The stone church consists of a two-bay nave and a chancel. The two-stage tower dates from the 14th century. The tower has four bells.

Inside the church is a 15th century octagonal font.

See also  
 List of ecclesiastical parishes in the Diocese of Bath and Wells

References

Grade II* listed buildings in Sedgemoor
Grade II* listed churches in Somerset